Lac de Calca Tavulaghjiu is a reservoir in the Haute-Corse department of France.

Location

The reservoir is formed by a gravity dam on the Ruisseau de Tavulaghiu.
This is a  stream that flows north through the commune of Galéria to enter the Mediterranean sea in the village of Galéria.

History

The dam was built to supply the village with water during the summer seasons. 
The outlet at the base of the structure brought water to the village by a pipeline running along the steep right bank of the stream. 
This required masonry work to support the conduit along the rock face, as well as construction of a small aqueduct on arrival in the village. 
These walls serve as a path.

Subacquatic flora and fauna have thus developed. 
Protected species include European pond turtles (Emys orbicularis), and the shallow waters around the edge of the reservoir hold watercress and many common frogs.

The dam is an obstacle to the flow of water and prevents fish going upstream.
Its outlet is near the center of the dike. 
Except in the dry period, the overflow forms a waterfall about ten meters high.

Gallery

Notes

Sources

Reservoirs of Haute-Corse